Multipurpose Transaction Protocol (MTP) software is a proprietary transport protocol (OSI Layer 4) developed and marketed by Data Expedition, Inc. (DEI).  DEI claims that MTP offers superior performance and reliability when compared to the Transmission Control Protocol (TCP) transport protocol.

General
MTP is implemented using the User Datagram Protocol (UDP) packet format.  It uses proprietary flow-control and error-correction algorithms to achieve reliable delivery of data and avoid network flooding.

Compatibility
Because MTP/IP uses proprietary algorithms, compatible software must be installed on both ends of a communication path.  Use of the UDP packet format permits compatibility with standard Internet Protocol (IP) network hardware and software.  MTP/IP applications may use any available UDP port number.

MTP and the applications which use it have been implemented for several operating systems, including versions of Microsoft Windows, macOS, iOS, Linux, FreeBSD, and Solaris.  Hardware platforms include variants of x86 and ARM.

Availability
MTP/IP is marketed by Data Expedition, Inc.  Trial versions of applications which use MTP/IP are available on the company's website.

See also
 Internet protocol suite
 Micro Transport Protocol (µTP)
 QUIC (Quick UDP Internet Connections)
 Stream Control Transmission Protocol (SCTP UDP Encapsulation; RFC 6951)

References

External links
Forbes -- "Faster Flow, Secure Clouds And Spin Funding", February 2019
The Broadcast Bridge -- "Field Report: Maximizing the Technology You Already Have", September 2017
Enterprise Tech -- "TCP/IP Outdated for Big Data Transport, Quiet Company Says", April 2017
Silicon Angle -- "Data Expedition brings its FTP data transfer alternative to the cloud", April 2017
Packet Pushers -- "Introducing Data Expedition And MTP/IP", April 2017
Norman Transcript -- "Local Startup Company Nets Emmy", August 2014
Variety -- "NATAS Announces Technology and Engineering Emmy Recipients", August 2014
US Patent 7158479
US Patent 7313627
US Patent 7404003
US Patent 7630315
US Patent 8014289

Internet protocols
Transport layer protocols